Mohamed Kanneh (born 15 March 1991) is a Liberian footballer. He currently plays as a midfielder .

Career
He formerly played for Al-Sailiya, Al-Markhiya, Al-Arabi, Al-Wakrah, and Muaither.

External links

References

Living people
1991 births
Liberian footballers
Liberian expatriate footballers
Al-Sailiya SC players
Al-Markhiya SC players
Al-Arabi SC (Qatar) players
Al-Wakrah SC players
Muaither SC players
Qatar Stars League players
Qatari Second Division players
Association football midfielders
Expatriate footballers in Qatar
Place of birth missing (living people)